Sustainable refurbishment describes working on existing buildings to improve their environmental performance using sustainable methods and materials. A refurbishment or retrofit is defined as: “any work to a building over and above maintenance to change its capacity, function or performance’ in other words, any intervention to adjust, reuse, or upgrade a building to suit new conditions or requirements” [7]. Refurbishment can be done to a part of a building, an entire building, or a campus [5]. Sustainable refurbishment takes this a step further to modify the existing building to perform better in terms of its environmental impact and its occupants' environment.

Sustainable refurbishment is the equivalent of sustainable development which relates to new developments of cities, buildings or industries etc.
Sustainable refurbishment includes insulation and related measures to reduce the energy consumption of buildings, installation of renewable energy sources such as solar water heating and photovoltaics, measures to reduce water consumption, and changes to reduce overheating, improve ventilation and improve internal comfort. The process of sustainable refurbishment includes minimizing the waste of existing components, recycling and using environmentally friendly materials, and minimizing energy use, noise and waste during the refurbishment.

The importance of sustainable refurbishment is that the majority of buildings in use are not new and thus were constructed when energy standards were low or non-existent, and are otherwise incompatible with current standards or the expectations of users. Much of the existing building stock is likely to be in use for many years to come since demolition and replacement is often unacceptable owing to cost, social disruption or because the building is of architectural and/or historical interest. The solution is to refurbish or renovate such buildings to make them appropriate for current and future use and to satisfy current requirements and standards of energy use and comfort.

Sustainable refurbishment is not a new concept but is gaining recognition and importance owing to current concerns about high energy use leading to climate change, overheating in buildings, the need for healthy internal environments, waste and environmental damage associated with materials production. Many governments are beginning to realize the importance of sustainably renovating their existing building stock, rather than just raising standards for new buildings and developments, and are producing guidance and grants and other support and stimulation activities. Think-tanks, lobby groups and voluntary organizations continue to publicize and promote the need for and practice of sustainable refurbishment. Examples and demonstration projects abound in many countries.

The techniques of sustainable refurbishment have been developing over many years and though the principles are very similar to those used on new buildings, the practice and details appropriate for the wide range of situations found in old buildings has required development of specific solutions and guidance to optimize the process and avoid subsequent problems. Detailed technical guidance is widely available from government-sponsored sources.

Why Sustainable Refurbishment?

Climate Change
One of the objectives of the United Nations Framework Convention on Climate Change (UNFCCC) is the mitigation of greenhouse gas emissions that contribute to climate change. More specifically, the UN supports the immediate reduction of building-related greenhouse gas emissions [1]. Building refurbishment plays a key role in the decarbonization of the current building stock [3]. Other than tearing down existing buildings, it is the only way to improve building performance or to develop zero-emission buildings [1]. Energy-efficient refurbishments are a tool to reduce energy consumption in buildings [4], which will result in lower greenhouse gas emissions and resource use [5]. Studies present the significance of the possible impact of widespread refurbishment implementation on individual GHG emissions, but also worldwide emissions and energy consumption [2].

Environmental Justice & Social Sustainability
Social sustainability relates to the impacts of a building on the surrounding or occupying society, community, and individuals [5]. This is considered in environmental impact assessment tools, such as life cycle assessment (LCA). Sustainable refurbishment integrates economic, social, and environmental needs to improve upon the existing building conditions [4]. For example, sustainable buildings are socially sustainable because they are healthier for occupants due to the use of materials that do not negatively impact health [5].

Indoor Environmental Quality
The indoor environmental quality of the existing building stock is known to often be more unsatisfactory and unhealthy than the outdoor environment due to the design and materials used. The leading argument for sustainable refurbishment, and sustainable building in general, is the belief that green buildings are healthier and more satisfactory for occupants [5]. The specifications for sustainable refurbishments take measures to ensure that the materials and building framework does not radiate dangerous particulates and gasses, like sulfur dioxide and nitrogen dioxide, into the indoor environment, and further measures are taken to filter indoor air for inhabitants [4,6]. The “Citizen’s Healthcare Principle” states that sustainable refurbishments must ensure that buildings are safe and improve living quality for those inside [4]. The refurbishment design must consider both the indoor microclimate and the external environment around the building when developing the program [4]. The microclimate parameters that should be considered include:
 Air velocity
 Humidity
 Dew point
 Lighting
 Air circulation velocity
 Acoustics
 Temperature

Historic Conservation
The preservation of historic buildings is inherently sustainable since it maximizes the lifespan of existing materials and infrastructure [1]. Conserving the materials and existing structures reduces waste and preserves the character of small historic communities. Many argue that the epitome of sustainability is to not build at all, which equites to preservation and refurbishment.

Finite Resources: Materials and Energy
As a society, we have a finite amount of many resources, nonrenewable energy sources for example. Non-sustainable buildings, in terms of their operation, also consume a significant amount of non-renewable energy resources, relative to other industries. Again, it is necessary to increase the energy efficiency of the existing building stick to reduce non-renewable energy resource consumption, or even replace that with renewable sources entirely [1]. Efficiency can be improved through sustainable building refurbishments that modify the building systems and building operations. With buildings becoming more energy efficient it is increasingly important to look at the life cycle impact of the materials that make up the building [3]. Designing and constructing buildings that are not sustainable for long lifetimes allows for the construction and demolition of buildings with short lifetimes, which wastes construction materials that are not used for their entire lifetime capacity. Reusing existing buildings enables building owners to use the embodied energy that is already invested in the building composition, rather than wasting that embodied carbon and consuming more with a new building construction [5].

Development of the Goals of Sustainable Refurbishment
This section lays out a timeline and progression of the development of the goals of sustainable refurbishment from a few different authors:

The main goals of “sustainable development”, by Baldwin in 1996, include minimizing the impact on human health and the environment, optimal use of non-renewable resources, utilizing renewable resources, and future planning and adaptability [4,8]. Minimizing impact on the climate and ecological system is achieved through a reduction of emissions of greenhouse gasses, which is connected to the other goal of optimizing the use of non-renewable resources. By reducing the non-renewable energy sources used to construct and operate buildings, the embodied greenhouse gas emissions from buildings are also reduced. The refurbishment could also attempt to protect and enhance local ecology through landscape architecture [4]. Human health is preserved by increasing ventilation and air filtration of indoor spaces and by avoiding potentially harmful construction materials that can impact respiratory health. This can also be achieved by encouraging the reuse or recycling of materials to reduce or eliminate material waste. The goal of renewable resource use can be achieved in a refurbishment by electrifying the home’s heating and cooling systems, by installing on-site renewables generation and storage, or by using renewable resource products as building materials – like timber [4]. Building for the future can be achieved through refurbishment by making an existing building more durable and extending the previous lifespan of the building. 

In 1996, Keeping and Shiers described the goals of “green refurbishments” as having three parts [4,9]. The first part includes lower utility costs since less energy is consumed due to a combination of efficient and passive heating and cooling systems. The second part ensures lower maintenance costs since the refurbished systems are simpler and were installed to be accessible for repairs. Finally, the third portion claims that buildings with green refurbishments are healthier and more comfortable for occupants [4].

Ultimately, in 2006, Sitar et al. defined the principles of “sustainable refurbishments” [4,10]. The goals include decreasing the energy used during operation, which includes heating, cooling, ventilation, lighting, etc. Another goal is the utilization of both renewable energy sources and low-impact materials regarding the indoor micro-environment, as well as the exterior macro-environment. They claim to achieve improvement in living conditions in terms of human health, user-friendly controls, and adaptability for future needs [4]. The goal is that this all be achieved through innovation planning to develop a design that is environmentally, economically, and socially beneficial.

Characteristics of Sustainable Refurbishment

Holistic Improvement
Sustainable refurbishments aim to reach “total building performance optimization” with the integrates of multiple systems throughout the building and the community [1]. The refurbishment not only decreases energy consumption but also improves occupant comfort in terms of noise, temperature, lighting, etc. It extends the life cycle of the building, reduces environmental impact, and creates healthy occupant conditions [4].

Environmental Responsibility
Sustainable refurbishments aim to minimize the negative environmental impacts of the renovation by reducing quantities of harmful materials, utilizing energy-saving technology, and retrofitting the building for renewable energy use, as opposed to non-renewable energy sources [4]. Some responsible environmental measures that can be incorporated in a building retrofit include energy and water efficiency, waste reduction and recycling, use of low environmental impact materials, and effective building operation [5]. An example of energy-efficient designs could include high-efficiency lighting and smart controls. Similarly, an example of water-efficient design could include dual-flushing toilets, greywater recycling, or aerating water fixtures.

Energy Efficiency
A sustainable retrofit ensures that the energy performance of the building after renovation is significantly better than it was before the work. The increase in energy performance must meet the current building regulations for new buildings [2]. The sustainable approach would be to even design beyond the code minimum and plan for future requirements. A deep energy refurbishment should include the integration of energy generation on-site from renewable energy sources, with the goal of developing a nearly zero-energy building. The energy efficiency gained through the architectural retrofit makes the integration of renewable energy sources cost-effective [2]. A study in the United Kingdom showed that, after a refurbishment, buildings had lower operating costs even if sustainability was not a priority of the retrofit [5].

A study of energy refurbishments of residential buildings showed that the refurbishment led to an average thermal energy savings of 59% during the heating season [2]. The savings consisted of 25% from thermal insulation addition in exterior walls and floor, 10% from window insulation improvements, 6% from a reduction in air exchange, and 18% from the installation of heating controls [2]. The retrofit of the building envelope and operation reduced the energy consumption of the building, the associated greenhouse gas emissions during the operation phase, and the overall environmental impact [3,5].

Sustainable refurbishment ensures energy efficiency by improving the following systems [4]:
 Insulation 
 Building Envelope Tightness 
 Heating 
 Cooling 
 Conditioning 
 Lighting 

There are typical strategies to improve upon each of the above systems. Innovative insulation materials can be utilized that have a lower environmental impact, but even non-sustainable insulation additions can improve the energy performance of the building [4]. The building envelope can be improved by replacing the existing windows with efficient windows in terms of thermal bridging and optimizing solar gain [4]. The use of passive ventilation strategies or hybrid systems that use both passive and active strategies reduces the energy required for conditioning [4]. Buildings’ heating and cooling systems can be powered with solar energy, or even use solar-heated water, which both reduce non-renewable energy consumption through heating and cooling [4]. Finally, the electricity used for lighting can be reduced by optimizing daylighting in occupiable spaces [4].

Improved Materials Based on Impact
The overall environmental impact of a sustainable refurbishment is highly dependent on the material choices for the refurbishment [3]. The Rational Resources Principle for refurbishment encourages the efficient use of construction materials and natural resources [4]. This is quantified through life cycle analysis that measures the impact of a material over its lifetime, which stretches into the “D phase” that includes end-of-life waste after the building is demolished [3,4]. Waste transportation adds costs to both construction and building maintenance. Designing refurbishments that reduce waste, and maximize reuse, minimize waste hauling costs in the short-term and long-term by using materials for their entire intended life [4]. 

When materials can be compared on the basis of a common bottom line, through life cycle analysis, an optimum path for the design appears [3]. Ultimately, since the refurbishment will require additional construction materials, there will be a negative environmental impact, but the aim of sustainable refurbishment is to minimize these impacts [3]. For example, reusing on-site timber, using reclaimed timber, and using timber from renewable certified sources are sustainable material choices based on taking advantage of the embodied carbon that has already been invested in those materials [5]. As was mentioned prior, the analysis of the life cycle of building materials’ primary energy demand and global warming potential is becoming more important as buildings are consuming less energy during their operation [3]. The human health impact of materials is also included in their life cycle assessment, meaning that a construction material cannot be sustainable if it harms its occupants. Therefore, sustainable refurbishments should not include adhesives, paints, or glues that expel low-volatile organic compounds into the indoor air of the building [5]. Materials that harm indoor occupants or the exterior ecology are considered lethal and are therefore not utilized in sustainable refurbishments [6].

Concept Model

The image shown is a conceptual model of sustainable refurbishment [4]. The dimensions of the model include technical, economic, architectural, social, ecological, and cultural. The dimensions are all related and influence each other and the refurbishment design itself [4]. The model depicts how stakeholders expect the refurbishment  design to yield energy savings, increased occupant comfort and health, extension of the building's lifetime, environmental protection, and, of course, an economic outcome. These expectation align with the goals for sustainable refurbishment that were developed in the previous section. The concept model also introduces the steps of the refurbishment process that will be discussed next in this article.

Steps of Sustainable Refurbishment Process
The principle of sustainable refurbishment should be incorporated into the project development from the first schematic through building commissioning and turnover. This section provides a generalized list of steps in the design process for a sustainable refurbishment [4]:

1. Data collection:
 Problem formulation
 Project goals developed
2. Determination of the degree of refurbishment necessary:
 Physical deterioration?
 Presence of moisture [1]?
 Thermal bridging [1]?
 Current code requirements not met?
 High energy demand/consumption?
 Poor indoor environmental quality and/or air quality?
 Poor outdoor air quality [1]?
 Unsatisfied occupants?
3. Modeling phase:
 Analyze data collected
 Develop criteria to base the alternative comparison on
 Develop design alternatives (consider stakeholders and look at best practices)
4. Selection Phase:
 Evaluate alternatives (address strengths and weaknesses)
 Choose a recommendation
 Optimize chosen design
5. Implementation Phase

In the modeling phase, it is important to consider the greater environment that the refurbishment is impacting because decisions cannot be made separate from this context [4]. The social and political conditions of the community need to be considered, specifically the living conditions and standards. The other context to consider is the ecological conditions, like the average temperature, humidity, soil quality, natural resources, topography, etc. [4].

Sustainable Refurbishment Case Study
A 2019 case study in Vienna explored the impact of a sustainable refurbishment that included a Multi-Active Façade System [3]. The assumption of the study was that the improvement of the outermost layer of the structure, the façade shell, was the most important regarding energy efficiency [3]. Insulation, specifically, was a major contributor to energy savings during building operation, and a life cycle analysis was required to make an informed decision about the insulation material [3]. The façade system in this study reduced the building’s energy demand with insulation and corrugated board, which passively increased the solar gain in the winter when extra heat was required to minimize energy consumption and reduced the solar gain during the summer [3]. This was achieved by installing the façade at a strategic angle to allow ultraviolet rays to pass through only when the sun is at its lower winter angle. The façade also integrated renewable energy generation into the shell itself, as well as energy storage for when there is no active radiation [3]. After the sustainable refurbishment with the new facade, the heating demand for the building was modeled to be about 53% less than the baseline value [3]. The low energy demand even exceeded the new building standard requirements for 2021 by about 45%, making the design adaptable and resilient for the future [3].

Criticism

Technological Developments Needed
There is criticism of the efficacy of sustainable refurbishment in terms of decarbonizing the current building stock. This criticism is directed specifically toward large-scale energy refurbishments of industrial structures. One could argue that the embodied and operational carbon of those types of buildings are significantly larger than that of smaller residential or office buildings which are discussed in this article. However, the technology to efficiently heat, cool, and power these structures do not yet exist, and they cannot completely rely on passive strategies due to more stringent code restrictions [2]. It cannot be expected that these large-impact buildings be refurbished if it cannot be done economically. This argument impacts the hopeful global energy consumption decrease that researchers propose for sustainable refurbishments.

Adaptability of Current Housing Stock
Another criticism of sustainable refurbishments is that not all existing buildings are good candidates for refurbishment. Put plainly, it is challenging to improve on buildings that were poorly designed from the start. It was proven that floor plans that are typical, with deep shapes, were more adaptable than irregular designs [5]. Similarly, floor-to-floor heights impact the designer and contractor’s ability to modify utility ducts, meaning that taller buildings are easier to refurbish [2]. Research also shows that structures that qualify as “higher grade” building stock experience greater levels and frequency of sustainable refurbishment [5]. There seem to be a number of reasons for this, one being that premium buildings undergo retrofit earlier in their lifecycle in order to compete with newer sustainable buildings [5]. It can be argued that it is not sustainable to replace building systems early in their lifecycle, just to invest in additional embodied carbon and discard the old equipment into a landfill. However, there is an opportunity for “young” removed materials to be utilized in lower-quality refurbishments in low-income communities [5]. In an Australian study using data from 2007, it was found that about 89% of all premium retrofits were to buildings that were less than 25 years old, with the remaining 11% aged between 26 and 50 years old [5]. The same study showed that no refurbishments occurred in the “least desirable” stock locations [5].

Social Justice
This gap in building improvement should be addressed by policymakers to avoid an environmental justice issue with a “two-tiered” market [5]. Of course, the premium stock has high rental prices which incentivize owners to invest in them further, which is not the case for the lower quality stock. It is not fair or just that only occupants that can afford premium housing get to live in the ensured healthy and comfortable environment of a sustainable refurbishment. The Affordability Principle states that sustainable refurbishments should be affordable for the general population [4]. In addition, information about sustainable refurbishment should be shared and freely available to people of all income levels, ages, races, etc. because everyone deserves an equal opportunity to live better.

Example demonstration projects
 http://www.dena.de
 http://www.superhomes.org.uk

Sources of technical guidance
 http://www.energysavingtrust.org.uk
 http://www.ademe.fr
 http://www.nps.gov/tps/standards/rehabilitation/guidelines/index.htm

See also

General
 Green retrofit
 Building Science
 Architectural Engineering

Energy and HVAC
 Deep energy retrofit
 Low-energy_building
 Zero-energy building
 Zero_heating_building
 List_of_low-energy_building_techniques
 Efficient_energy_use

Indoor Environmental Quality
 Greening
 Sick building syndrome
 Healthy_building

Material Choices
 Deconstruction
 Sustainable architecture
 Sustainable_materials_management
 Building_insulation_material
 Insulated_glazing
 Life-cycle_assessment
 Environmental_Product_Declaration

Design Standards
 Passive_house
 LEED
 Living_Building_Challenge
 BREEAM

References
[1] Todorovic, Marija S., et al. “Historic Building’s Holistic and Sustainable Deep Energy Refurbishment via BPS, Energy Efficiency and Renewable energy—A Case Study.” Energy and Buildings, vol. 95, 2015, pp. 130–37, https://doi.org/10.1016/j.enbuild.2014.11.011.   

[2] Todorovic, Marija. "Large scale residential/municipal RES integrated refurbishment construction and HVAC systems engineering R&D needs." ASHRAE Transactions, vol. 118, no. 1, Jan. 2012, pp. 50+. Gale Academic OneFile, link.gale.com/apps/doc/A295268197/AONE?u=mlin_oweb&sid=googleScholar&xid=9198eb60. Accessed 30 Nov. 2022.    

[3] Sattler, Stefan, and Doris Osterreicher. “Assessment of Sustainable Construction Measures in Building Refurbishment-Life Cycle Comparison of Conventional and Multi-Active Facade Systems in a Social Housing Complex.” Sustainability (Basel, Switzerland), vol. 11, no. 16, 2019, p. 4487–, https://doi.org/10.3390/su11164487. 

[4] Mickaityte, Aiste, et al. “The Concept Model of Sustainable Buildings Refurbishment.” International Journal of Strategic Property Management, vol. 12, no. 1, 2008, pp. 53–68, https://doi.org/10.3846/1648-715X.2008.12.53-68.  

[5] Wilkinson, Sara. "Analysing sustainable retrofit potential in premium office buildings." Structural Survey 30.5 (2012): 398-410. 

[6] Sharma, Nitish Kumar. "Sustainable building material for green building construction, conservation and refurbishing." Int. J. Adv. Sci. Technol 29 (2020): 5343-5350. 

[7] Douglas, J. (2006), Building Retrofit, Butterworth Heinemann, London.

[8] Baldwin, R. (1996) Environmental assessment and management of buildings. In: Proceedings of the International CIB TG  Workshop, Building and Environment in Central and Eastern Europe, Warsaw, October

[9] Keeping,  M.  and  Shiers,  D.  (1996)  The  “green”  re-furbishment of commercial property, Facilities,14(3/4),  pp.  15–19.

[10] Sitar,  M.,  Dean,  K.  and  Kristja,  K.  (2006)  The  Ex-isting Housing Stock – New Renovation Possi-bilities; A Case of Apartment building Renewalin  Maribor.  Research  Report  presented  at  theConference  Housing  in  an  expanding  Europe:theory, policy, participation and implementation(ENHR).  Urban  Planning  Institute  of  the  Re-public  of  Slovenia,  Jul.  2006,  Slovenia.

Several books on the subject have been published aimed at different audiences, for example:
 for architects and other professionals:
 
 
 for the DIY market: 
 

Sustainable architecture
Low-energy building
Sustainable building
Environmental social science concepts